Majak Mawith (born 19 September 1999) is a South Sudanese professional footballer who plays as a goalkeeper for Australian NPL Victoria club Port Melbourne SC and the South Sudan national team.

References

1999 births
Living people
People from Rift Valley Province
People with acquired South Sudanese citizenship
South Sudanese refugees
South Sudanese footballers
Association football goalkeepers
South Sudan international footballers
South Sudanese emigrants to Australia
Naturalised citizens of Australia
Australian soccer players
Melbourne Victory FC players
Melbourne City FC players
National Premier Leagues players